The following highways are numbered 849:

United States